Pesac is a commune in Timiș County, Romania. Part of Periam commune until 2007, it is composed of a single village, Pesac.

History 
The first recorded mention of Pesac dates from 1399, when it is mentioned in a Hungarian diploma as Puerseegh. In 1426 it is attested with the name Pwrsegh, and in 1549 Persek. After this period it does not appear mentioned anywhere.

Today's locality was re-established in 1768, by settling here the inhabitants of the neighboring village Sânpetru Sârbesc (present-day Sânpetru Mare) due to frequent floods and unfavorable land for agriculture. The first inhabitants were the Romanians from Sânpetru who settled on the estate of Iosif Bayzath. He offered them land to build their houses. The new locality was named Pesak.

Historian Ioan Lotreanu claims that the first inhabitants were the Romanians from Sânpetru who left there because they did not get along with the Serbs. After the establishment of the locality, the documents speak of Pesak as a Serbian locality. It had a Serbian name, and the Slavonic language was used in the church. However, in 1774, i.e. six years after its establishment, Pesac already appears in the documents of the land book of the Cenad constituency, on which it depended as walachisches ort ("Vlach village"). It is therefore impossible that the village was Romanianized in such a short time, as it was Romanian from the very beginning.

From 1778 Banat was incorporated into Hungary, so that from 1779, Pesac commune was part of Torontál County. In 1799 Bayzath colonized 62 families of Romanian serfs from the parts of Sibiu, further strengthening the Romanian element. Later, Bayzath's brother colonized Germans from neighboring villages at Pesac. They held a significant share of the population until after World War II, when their numbers began to decline sharply.

Demographics 

Pesac had a population of 1,990 inhabitants at the 2011 census, down 8% from the 2002 census. Most inhabitants are Romanians (88.84%), with a minority of Roma (5.63%). For 4.72% of the population, ethnicity is unknown. By religion, most inhabitants are Orthodox (82.66%), but there are also minorities of Pentecostals (7.29%), Baptists (2.06%) and Adventists (1.01%). For 4.72% of the population, religious affiliation is unknown.

References 

Communes in Timiș County
Localities in Romanian Banat